Rannapungerja is a village in Alutaguse Parish, Ida-Viru County in northeastern Estonia.

Gallery

References
 

Villages in Ida-Viru County
Alutaguse Parish